= Changzhou University Huaide College =

College in Jiangsu, China

Changzhou University Huaide College (Chinese: 常州大学怀德学院), previously referred to as Huaide College of Jiangsu Polytechnic University, is a college in Jiangsu, China. It was jointly founded by Changzhou University and the People's Government of Jingjiang City in March 2002 and used the educational resources of Changzhou University. It began its move to Jingjiang in 2014.
